Toltén is a Chilean commune located at the lower flows Toltén River at the southern coast of Cautín Province which is part of Araucanía Region. The commune is administered by the municipality Nueva Toltén, the main harbour and town within the commune.

Demographics
Of these, 4,123 (36.8%) lived in urban areas and 7,093 (63.2%) in rural areas. The population fell by 7% (845 persons) between the 1992 and 2002 censuses.

Administration
As a commune, Toltén is a third-level administrative division of Chile administered by a municipal council, headed by an alcalde who is directly elected every four years. The 2008–2012 alcalde is Rafael García Ferlice (UDI).

Within the electoral divisions of Chile, Toltén is represented in the Chamber of Deputies by René Manuel García (RN) and Fernando Meza (PRSD) as part of the 52nd electoral district, together with Cunco, Pucón, Curarrehue, Villarrica, Loncoche and Gorbea. The commune is represented in the Senate by José Garcia Ruminot (RN) and Eugenio Tuma Zedan (PPD) as part of the 15th senatorial constituency (Araucanía-South).

References

Communes of Chile
Populated places in Cautín Province
1866 establishments in Chile
Coasts of Araucanía Region

es:Toltén
it:Toltén
nl:Toltén
pt:Toltén
ru:Тольтен